The discography of Jeezy, an American rapper, consists of 12 studio albums, 18 mixtapes, 70 singles (including 38 as a featured artist) and 28 music videos. Aside from his solo career, he has also released albums as a member of Boyz N Da Hood and U.S.D.A., respectively.

Studio albums

Collaborative albums

Compilation albums

EPs

Mixtapes

Singles

As lead artist

As featured artist

Promotional singles

Other charted songs

Guest appearances

Music videos

As lead artist

See also
 Boyz n da Hood discography
 U.S.D.A. discography

Notes

References

Discography
Hip hop discographies
Discographies of American artists